This is a list of electoral divisions and wards in the ceremonial county of West Sussex in South East England. All changes since the re-organisation of local government following the passing of the Local Government Act 1972 are shown. The number of councillors elected for each electoral division or ward is shown in brackets.

County council

West Sussex
Electoral Divisions from 1 April 1974 (first election 12 April 1973) to 2 May 1985:

Electoral Divisions from 2 May 1985 to 5 May 2005:

Electoral Divisions from 5 May 2005 to 4 June 2009:

Electoral Divisions from 4 June 2009 to present:

† minor boundary changes in 2017

District councils

Adur
Wards from 1 April 1974 (first election 7 June 1973) to 3 May 1979:

Wards from 3 May 1979 to 10 June 2004:

Wards from 10 June 2004 to present:

Arun
Wards from 1 April 1974 (first election 7 June 1973) to 5 May 1983:

Wards from 5 May 1983 to 1 May 2003:

Wards from 1 May 2003 to 7 May 2015:

Wards from 7 May 2015 to present:

Chichester
Wards from 1 April 1974 (first election 7 June 1973) to 3 May 1979:

Wards from 3 May 1979 to 1 May 2003:

Wards from 1 May 2003 to present:

Crawley
Wards from 1 April 1974 (first election 7 June 1973) to 3 May 1979:

† Charlwood and Horley wards were moved to Surrey by the Charlwood and Horley Act 1974

Wards from 3 May 1979 to 5 May 1983:

Wards from 5 May 1983 to 10 June 2004:

Wards from 10 June 2004 to 2 May 2019:

Wards from 2 May 2019 to present:

Horsham
Wards from 1 April 1974 (first election 7 June 1973) to 3 May 1979:

Wards from 3 May 1979 to 1 May 2003:

Wards from 1 May 2003 to present:

† minor boundary changes in 2015

Wards from 2 May 2019 to present:

Mid Sussex
Wards from 1 April 1974 (first election 7 June 1973) to 5 May 1983:

Wards from 5 May 1983 to 1 May 2003:

Wards from 1 May 2003 to present:

Worthing
Wards from 1 April 1974 (first election 7 June 1973) to 5 May 1983:

Wards from 5 May 1983 to 10 June 2004:

Wards from 10 June 2004 to present:

Electoral wards by constituency

Arundel and South Downs
Angmering, Arundel, Barnham, Bramber, Upper Beeding and Woodmancote, Bury, Chanctonbury, Chantry, Cowfold, Shermanbury and West Grinstead, Findon, Hassocks, Henfield, Hurstpierpoint and Downs, Petworth, Pulborough and Coldwatham, Steyning, Walberton, Wisborough Green.

Bognor Regis and Littlehampton
Aldwick East, Aldwick West, Beach, Bersted, Brookfield, Felpham East, Felpham West, Ham, Hotham, Marine, Middleton-on-Sea, Orchard, Pagham and Rose Green, Pevensey, River, Wick with Toddington, Yapton.

Chichester
Bosham, Boxgrove, Chichester East, Chichester North, Chichester South, Chichester West, Donnington, Easebourne, East Wittering, Fernhurst, Fishbourne, Funtington, Harting, Lavant, Midhurst, North Mundham, Plaistow, Rogate, Selsey North, Selsey South, Sidlesham, Southbourne, Stedham, Tangmere, West Wittering, Westbourne.

Crawley
Bewbush, Broadfield North, Broadfield South, Furnace Green, Gossops Green, Ifield, Langley Green, Maidenbower, Northgate, Pound Hill North, Pound Hill South and Worth, Southgate, Three Bridges, Tilgate, West Green.

East Worthing and Shoreham
Broadwater, Buckingham, Churchill, Cokeham, Eastbrook, Gaisford, Hillside, Manor, Marine, Mash Barn, Peverel, Offington, Selden, St Mary's, St Nicolas, Southlands, Southwick Green, Widewater.

Horsham
Ardingly and Balcombe, Billingshurst and Shipley, Broadbridge Heath, Crawley Down and Turners Hill, Denne, Forest, Holbrook East, Holbrook West, Horsham Park, Itchingfield, Slinfold and Warnham, Nuthurst, Roffey North, Roffey South, Rudgwick, Rusper and Colgate, Southwater, Trafalgar.

Mid Sussex
Ashurst Wood, Bolney, Burgess Hill Dunstall, Burgess Hill Franklands, Burgess Hill Leylands, Burgess Hill Meeds, Burgess Hill St Andrews, Burgess Hill Victoria, Cuckfield, East Grinstead Ashplats, East Grinstead Baldwins, East Grinstead Herontye, East Grinstead Imberhorne, East Grinstead Town, Haywards Heath Ashenground, Haywards Heath Bentswood, Haywards Heath Franklands, Haywards Heath Heath, Haywards Heath Lucastes, High Weald, Lindfield.

Worthing West
Castle, Central, Durrington, East Preston with Kingston, Ferring, Goring, Heene, Marine, Northbrook, Rustington East, Rustington West, Salvington, Tarring.

See also
List of parliamentary constituencies in West Sussex
List of electoral divisions in West Sussex 2009

References

 
West Sussex